Faith and Courage is the fifth studio album by Irish singer Sinéad O'Connor, released on 13 June 2000, by Atlantic Records. It was O'Connor's first release in three years, her previous album being the greatest hits package So Far... The Best of Sinéad O'Connor in 1997, plus it was her first studio album in six years.

O'Connor composed a majority of the tracks on Faith and Courage and production duties were shared by a variety of artists including Wyclef Jean, David A. Stewart, Brian Eno, Kevin "She'kspere" Briggs, Anne Preven and Scott Cutler among others.

Background
In 1998, Sinéad O'Connor left label Ensign Records and signed with Atlantic Records, but her album was delayed due to her personal struggles, including the birth of her daughter, an alleged suicide attempt, a bitter custody battle and becoming a priestess in a religious order. O'Connor described Faith and Courage, her first album with Atlantic, as a record about "survival" which depicted her own troubled "journey" as she bared her soul on a series of autobiographical and often cathartic songs. "It's exciting and a little scary to be back. I wanted to make a record which was strong and positive. It's about getting my spirit back on its feet and standing up", she said.

Andy Murray, marketing director of Warner Music Europe, commented: "It's the right time for her to break her silence. [...] and everybody seems to think it's her best album since her first record. The marketing campaign is about reminding people who she is. But actually, despite the long gap, nobody seems to need reminding. There's a real excitement around the record, which has surprised a lot of people".

Critical reception

Faith and Courage received positive reviews from music critics, including the best ones she had received in years. Irish Hot Press magazine suggested that the album was O'Connor's equivalent of Bob Dylan's Blood on the Tracks (1975).

It was placed on Slant Magazine's list of best albums of the 2000s at number 99.

Chart performance
The album was certified gold (35,000 Copies) in Australia in 2000. As of 2014, sales in the United States have exceeded 219,000 copies, according to Nielsen SoundScan.

Track listing

Charts

Personnel
Sinéad O'Connor - vocals
Skip McDonald - guitar, backing vocals
Carlton "Bubblers" Ogilvie - bass, piano
Professor Stretch - programming, keyboards
Rusty Anderson, Derek Scott, David A. Stewart, Scott Cutler - guitar
Paul Bushnell, Jah Wobble - bass
Scot Coogan, Lil John, Chris Sharrock, John Reynolds - drums
Jeff Turzo, Simon Mundey, Mark Price, Andy Wright - programming
David Campbell - strings arrangement, viola
Joel Derouin - violin
Larry Corbett - cello
Ed Rockett - low and high whistle
Caroline Dale - strings
Blandinna Melky Jean - additional vocals on track 4
Chucho Merchan - additional bass guitar on track 6
Little Roy - backing vocals on track 6
Zac Rae, Kieran Kiely, David Levita - keyboards
Anne Preven - backing vocals on track 9
Karren Berz - orchestral arrangement
Bonjo I Abinghi Noah - percussion

References

External links
 

2000 albums
Sinéad O'Connor albums
Albums arranged by David Campbell (composer)
Albums produced by Brian Eno
Albums produced by David A. Stewart
Atlantic Records albums